Orestis Grigoropoulos (born 4 July 2000) is a Greek professional footballer who plays as a right-back for Super League 2 club Irodotos.

References

2000 births
Living people
Greek footballers
Super League Greece players
Football League (Greece) players
Trikala F.C. players
Athlitiki Enosi Larissa F.C. players
Association football defenders